Sant Martí de Canals is a village located in the municipality of Conca de Dalt, in Province of Lleida province, Catalonia, Spain. As of 2020, it has a population of 37.

Geography 
Sant Martí de Canals is located 108km north-northeast of Lleida.

References

Populated places in the Province of Lleida